For Your Eyes Only may refer to:

 For Your Eyes Only (short story collection), by Ian Fleming, 1960
 For Your Eyes Only (film), a 1981 James Bond film
 For Your Eyes Only (soundtrack), soundtrack album for the film
 "For Your Eyes Only" (song), used in the film, sung by Sheena Easton
 "For Your Eyes Only", alternative song for the film by Blondie, on The Hunter (Blondie album)
 For Your Eyes Only (magazine), a 1980s gaming magazine
 4 Your Eyez Only, 2016 album by rapper J. Cole
 J. Cole: 4 Your Eyez Only, 2017 documentary by rapper J. Cole

See also 
 Eyes only, security classification
 "For Your Eye Only", an episode of the animated series Ultimate Spider-Man
 "Fur Your Eyes Only", a song by Shaggy and Alaine